Sir John Priestman, 1st Baronet (22 March 1855 – 5 August 1941) was a British shipbuilder and charitable benefactor.

Priestman was born in Bishop Auckland, County Durham, the son of Robert Priestman (1824–1867), a baker, and Jane Smith (c.1830–1903).

Aged 14, Priestman became an apprentice to John Blumer, a shipbuilder at Sunderland, and later became chief draughtsman at W. Pickersgill & Sons. In 1882, he set up his own yard at Castletown. He married Naomi Huntly (1857–1908) in 1881 at Sunderland.

Priestman donated £6000 to the building of St Andrew's Church, Roker (completed in 1907), which was built in memory to his mother. In 1931, he established the Sir John Priestman Trust, whose purposes included 'feeding of poor... in times of distress', the 'employment and payment of nurses for the sick and infirm' and the building, 'maintaining and furnishing (including provision of organs)' of 'churches and mission halls and schools'. In 1933 he donated £35,000 to the rebuilding of St Michael's Church, Sunderland, he paid for the building of St Wilfrid's Church, Halton, Leeds (built 1937–39) and in 1939 he financed £20,000 for the construction of the Priestman Building, originally a library for Sunderland Technical College and now part of the University of Sunderland.

Priestman was gazetted a Knight Bachelor for "public and political services in Sunderland" on 29 June 1923 and was knighted at Buckingham Palace by George V on 25 July. He was further gazetted a baronet, of Monkwearmouth in the County of Durham, for "services to many social organisations in Durham" on 1 June 1934 and his letters patent were issued on 30 June.

Priestman died in 1941, aged 86. As he died without male heirs, his baronetcy became extinct.

Notes and references

Sources

Grace's Guide: The Best of Engineering. 1750-1960s, John Priestman and Co
The Sunderland Site – Page 053, Shipbuilders – Page 17
A walk through Bishopwearmouth Conservation Area
Purchasing Power of British Pounds from 1264 to Present

1855 births
1941 deaths
People educated at Ackworth School
Baronets in the Baronetage of the United Kingdom
British shipbuilders
People from Sunderland
Businesspeople from Tyne and Wear
Knights Bachelor